The Western Australian Open and originally called the Western Australian Championships is a defunct Grand Prix tennis circuit Men's and WTA Tour affiliated women's tennis tournament played from 1971 to 1975 at Royal King's Park Tennis Club in Perth, Australia and was played on grass courts.

History
The event was first established in 1895 and continued for 78 editions the men's event was part of the pre-open era tour from 1895 to 1967 part of the Grand Prix tour in 1980 for certain periods after the open era it was part of the ITF non-aligned tournaments independent tour.

The women's even was part of WTA Tour affiliated women's tennis tournament played from 1971 to 1975. The women's event ended in 1994 and had run for 88 editions from 1895,

Margaret Court was the most successful player at the tournament, winning the singles competition three times and the doubles competition in 1971, partnering Australian Evonne Goolagong for her doubles success.

Winners
Incomplete list of champions included:

Singles

Doubles

References

External links
 WTA Results Archive

Grass court tennis tournaments
Defunct tennis tournaments in Australia
WTA Tour